Donatas Plungė (born November 11, 1960) is a retired male hammer thrower from Lithuania, who competed in the late 1980s and early 1990s on the highest level. He set his personal best (80.78 metres) on September 22, 1989 at a meet in Volgograd.

External links

Profile

1960 births
Living people
Lithuanian male hammer throwers
Place of birth missing (living people)
20th-century Lithuanian people